Zaykiel Leong (born 9 November 1980) is a Malaysian footballer who plays as a striker for Sabah FA in Malaysia Premier League.

Zaykiel has represented Sabah since 2002. He made it into the first eleven games during the 2003 season. He showed impressive playing style during the 2003 season as he netted 8 goals during the season and helped Sabah to reach the final of Malaysia Cup, but failed to win the cup after losing 3–0 to Selangor MPPJ by Juan Arostegui from Argentina.

For the 2009 season, he returned to play for Sabah after previously playing for Beverly FC in 2007.

References

1980 births
Living people
Malaysian footballers
Malaysian people of Chinese descent
Sabah F.C. (Malaysia) players
People from Sabah
Association football forwards